Manoba shrimptoni is a moth in the family Nolidae. It was described by Jeremy Daniel Holloway in 2003. It is found on Borneo. The habitat consists of montane areas.

The length of the forewings is 9 mm for males and 10 mm for females.

References

Moths described in 2003
Nolinae